is Japanese for a flower bud. It may refer to:

Music
 "Tsubomi" (song), by Kobukuro
 "Tsubomi", by Mikuni Shimokawa
 "Tsubomi", by Maria (band)

Fictional characters
 Tsubomi, a character in the visual novel Shuffle!
 Tsubomi Okuwaka, a character in the light novel series Strawberry Panic!.
 Tsubomi Hanasaki, a character in the anime HeartCatch PreCure!
 Tsubomi Kido, a character in the light novel series Kagerou Project

Other
 Tsubomi (magazine), a Japanese manga magazine
 Tsubomi, a Japanese adult video actress

See also
 Naisho no Tsubomi, (Secret Tsubomi) is a Japanese shōjo manga authored by Yuu Yabuuchi, and published by Shogakukan. 
 "Koi no Tsubomi", (Love Bud) Kumi Koda's 31st solo under the Rhythm Zone label
 "Kara no Tsubomi", a maxi single released by the J-pop singer, Mell